In organic chemistry, the term acetylenic designates
A doubly unsaturated position (sp-hybridized) on a molecular framework, for instance in an alkyne such as acetylene;
An ethynyl fragment, HCC–, or substituted homologue.

See also 
 Allylic/Homoallylic
 Benzylic
 Propargylic/Homopropargylic
 Vinylic

Organic chemistry